The Rotax 912 is a horizontally-opposed four-cylinder, naturally-aspirated, four-stroke aircraft engine with a  reduction gearbox. It features liquid-cooled cylinder heads and air-cooled cylinders. Originally equipped with carburetors, later versions are fuel injected. Dominating the market for small aircraft and kitplanes, Rotax produced its 50,000th 912-series engine in 2014.  Originally available only for light sport aircraft, ultralight aircraft, autogyros and drones, the 912-series engine was approved for certified aircraft in 1995.

Design and development

The Rotax 912 was first sold in 1989 in non-certificated form for use in ultralights and motorgliders.

The engine differs from previous generation aircraft engines (such as the Lycoming O-235) in that it has air-cooled cylinders with liquid-cooled heads and uses a 2.43:1 PSRU reduction gearbox to reduce the engine's relatively high 5,800 rpm shaft speed to a more conventional 2,400 rpm for the propeller. The gearbox has proven to be generally trouble-free. On the 912A, F and UL the standard reduction ratio is 2.27:1 with 2.43:1 optional. Lubrication is dry sump, and fuelling is via dual CV carburetors or fully redundant electronic fuel injection. The electronic fuel injected Rotax 912iS is a recent development.

The 912's lubrication system differs from most dry-sump designs in that oil is forced into the storage tank by crankcase pressure rather than by a separate scavenge pump. This requires a novel preflight inspection procedure: before checking the oil level with the dipstick, the engine is "burped" by removing the oil filler cap and turning the propeller until a gurgling sound is heard, which indicates that all oil has been forced into the tank and the oil level can now be checked accurately.

The 912 is more fuel efficient and lighter than comparable older engines, e.g., Continental O-200, but originally had a shorter time between overhaul (TBO). On introduction, the TBO was only 600 hours, which was double that of previous Rotax engines but far short of existing engines of comparable size and power. The short TBO and lack of certification for use in factory-built type certificated aircraft initially restricted its worldwide market potential. However, the engine received US Federal Aviation Administration (FAA) certification in 1995, and by 1999, the TBO had increased to 1,200 hours; on 14 December 2009, the TBO was raised from 1,200 hours to 1,500 hours, or 1,500 hours to 2,000 hours, depending on serial number. In addition to the lower fuel consumption, the 912 is certified to run on automotive fuel (mogas), further reducing running costs, especially in areas where leaded avgas is not readily available. The 912 may be operated using leaded fuel, but this is not recommended as lead sludge tends to accumulate in the oil tank and reduction gearbox. Also, avgas is incompatible with the recommended synthetic oil which cannot hold lead in suspension; consequently, the use of leaded fuel mandates additional maintenance.

The 912S is certified, as are the A and F, which are used in the Diamond DA20, which is quite popular in Europe. The 912's popularity was greatly enhanced by the introduction of the light-sport aircraft category in Europe and the United States, which resulted in the introduction of many factory-built aircraft designed to fully exploit the engine's small size and light weight. The  versions are used in many light sport aircraft, such as the Zenith STOL CH 701 and the Tecnam P2002 Sierra. The  versions are sufficient to power the new generation of efficient motorgliders, such as the Pipistrel Sinus and the Urban Air Lambada. It is also fitted to some light twins, such as the Tecnam P2006T.

On 8 March 2012 the company displayed its 912 iS variant, a  version with fuel injection and an electronic engine management unit. The version weighs , which is  more than the standard 912S. The non-certified 912 iS targets the light sport and homebuilt aircraft market and 912 iSc will be certified. Production started in March 2012 and the engine has a 2000-hour recommended time-between-overhaul to start.

On 1 April 2014 the company announced its new 912 iS Sport upgrade with greater power and torque and reduced fuel consumption.  A further derivative, the  Rotax 915 iS, was announced in July 2015.

Rotax's warnings to flyers
Unusually for a manufacturer of small aero-engines, Rotax publishes extensive warnings in the owner's manual about both the certified and non-certified versions of the engine design. Pilots are cautioned that the 912 engine is not suitable for:
use in situations where a safe landing cannot be made
use in rotorcraft
night flying (unless equipped with redundant electrical power), or 
aerobatics. 
The manual states that Rotax gives no assurances that the engine is suitable for use in any aircraft, and that the engine may seize or stall at any time, which could lead to a crash landing. The manual adds that non-compliance with such warnings could lead to serious injury or death.

Variants
The engine is available in the following versions:

912 A#
Certified to JAR 22, with dual carburetors and electronic ignition
912 F#
Certified to FAR 33, with dual carburetors and electronic ignition
912 iS
Uncertified,  with direct fuel injection and an electronic engine management unit
912 iSc
Certified,  with direct fuel injection and an electronic engine management unit
912 iS Sport
Uncertified, aluminum airbox, longer intake runners and eco-mode when operated below 97% power setting.
912 S#
Certified to FAR 33,  with larger bore than 912A/F/UL, with dual carburetors and electronic ignition
912 UL#
Uncertified, similar to the 912A/F
912 ULS#
Uncertified, similar to the 912S
912 ULSFR#
Uncertified French Authority specification. 

The # in the designation stands for: 
 Shaft with flange for fixed pitch propeller, P.C.D. 100 mm
 Shaft with flange for fixed pitch propeller, P.C.D. 75 mm, P.C.D. 80 mm and P.C.D. 4 inches
 Shaft with flange for constant speed propeller P.C.D. 75 mm, P.C.D. 80 mm, P.C.D. 4 inches and drive for hydraulic governor for constant speed propeller
 Shaft with flange for fixed pitch propeller P.C.D. 75 mm, P.C.D. 80 mm, P.C.D. 4 inches also can be fitted with an adaptor, drive and governor for a constant speed propeller.

Applications

Specifications (Rotax 912 UL/A/F)

See also

References

External links

The aircraft engines section of the official Rotax company website
FAA Type Certificate Data Sheet E00051EN 
912 UL 80 hp Engine Datasheet
912 ULS 100 hp Engine Datasheet
914 UL 115 hp Turbocharged Engine Datasheet

Boxer engines
Rotax engines
1980s aircraft piston engines